In mathematics, particularly calculus, a vertical tangent is a tangent line that is vertical. Because a vertical line has infinite slope, a function whose graph has a vertical tangent is not differentiable at the point of tangency.

Limit definition
A function ƒ has a vertical tangent at x = a if the difference quotient used to define the derivative has infinite limit:

The first case corresponds to an upward-sloping vertical tangent, and the second case to a downward-sloping vertical tangent. The graph of ƒ has a vertical tangent at x = a if the derivative of ƒ at a is either positive or negative infinity.

For a continuous function, it is often possible to detect a vertical tangent by taking the limit of the derivative. If

then ƒ must have an upward-sloping vertical tangent at x = a. Similarly, if

then ƒ must have a downward-sloping vertical tangent at x = a. In these situations, the vertical tangent to ƒ appears as a vertical asymptote on the graph of the derivative.

Vertical cusps
Closely related to vertical tangents are vertical cusps. This occurs when the one-sided derivatives are both infinite, but one is positive and the other is negative. For example, if

then the graph of ƒ will have a vertical cusp that slopes up on the left side and down on the right side.

As with vertical tangents, vertical cusps can sometimes be detected for a continuous function by examining the limit of the derivative. For example, if 

then the graph of ƒ will have a vertical cusp at x = a that slopes down on the left side and up on the right side.

Example
The function

has a vertical tangent at x = 0, since it is continuous and

Similarly, the function

has a vertical cusp at x = 0, since it is continuous,

and

References
 Vertical Tangents and Cusps. Retrieved May 12, 2006.

Mathematical analysis